Kharcho, also spelled as Harcho, is a traditional Georgian soup containing beef, rice, cherry plum purée and chopped walnuts (Juglans regia). The soup is usually served with finely chopped fresh coriander. The characteristic ingredients of the soup are meat, cherry plum purée made from tklapi or tkemali, rice, chopped  walnuts and a spice mix which varies between different regions of Georgia.

An example of a Georgian recipe for Kharcho is made using beef, lamb, pork, chicken or goose.
Cut a cleaned, thoroughly washed piece of beef brisket into pieces, put it in 2 quarts of water, bring to the boil and simmer for 2–2.5 hours, skimming the foam. When the meat is soft add the rice;  after 10 minutes add the chopped walnuts, allspice, bay leaf and peppercorns. When it is almost ready add the cherry plum paste, the spices (cerulea, coriander seed, paprika, Turkish smoked red pepper) and then simmer for 5 minutes more. Adjust salt, add the fresh coriander, let it cool, and serve.

See also

List of soups

References

Georgian soups
Soviet cuisine